Weyprecht Glacier is a glacier in Jan Mayen. It is the longest glacier located in the Beerenberg area.

The glacier is named after Austro-Hungarian Arctic explorer Karl Weyprecht.

See also
List of glaciers in Norway
Svalbard and Jan Mayen

References

External links
 Glacier retreat in Jan Mayen
 Glaciers of Jan Mayen

Glaciers of Jan Mayen